Stephen Plunkett (born September 1, 1981) is an American actor.  He is best known for his performances in the NBC series, Rise, and John Magary's The Mend, which premiered at the 2014 South by Southwest Film Festival.

Plunkett is also known for his performances in New York theater, which include roles in War Horse, The Orphans' Home Cycle, Gone Missing, This Beautiful City, On the Levee, London Wall, and Dada Woof Papa Hot.

Early life
Plunkett was born on September 1, 1981 in Jacksonville, Texas.  His father is a Presbyterian minister and his mother a special education teacher.

Plunkett attended the University of Evansville and received a Master of Fine Arts from the Tisch School of the Arts at New York University.

Career
Plunkett moved to New York after graduating from college.

Plunkett is an associate artist of The Civilians.

In 2010, Plunkett was cast in Russell Harbaugh's short film Rolling on the Floor Laughing which was featured at the 2012 Sundance Film Festival.

In 2011, Plunkett made his Broadway debut in War Horse at the Vivian Beaumont Theater at Lincoln Center for the Performing Arts

In 2013, Plunkett was cast alongside Josh Lucas and Mickey Sumner in The Mend, which premiered at South By Southwest in March 2014.

In 2017, Plunkett was cast as Robert Saunders in Rise on NBC.

Filmography

Film

Television

Stage Work

Broadway

Off-Broadway

Awards 
2010 Drama Desk Special Award

References

University of Evansville alumni
Tisch School of the Arts alumni
American male film actors
American male stage actors
1981 births
Living people
American male television actors